René Herbst (March 18 , 1891 – September 29 , 1982, in Paris) was a French furniture designer and architect, best remembered for his advocacy of the industrialisation of furniture as a form of modern art. He co-founded The French Union of Modern Artists in 1929.

References 

1891 births
1982 deaths
French designers
Furniture designers